George T. Hepbron (August 27, 1863 – April 30, 1946) was a basketball referee. He is credited with writing the game's first book, How to Play Basketball, in 1904.

Hepbron was born in Still Pond, Maryland. He was a close friend of James Naismith, and subsequently played a major role in the early development of the game, especially in the area of rules. Hepbron held leadership roles with the Amateur Athletic Union Basketball Committee (1896) and the National Basketball Rules Committee (1915–1933).

He died in Newark, New Jersey, and was enshrined in the Naismith Memorial Basketball Hall of Fame in 1960 as a referee.

References

Further reading

External links 
 How to Play Basketball at Google Books

Basketball referees
Naismith Memorial Basketball Hall of Fame inductees
1863 births
1946 deaths